{{Infobox settlement
| official_name            = Town of Sellersburg
| settlement_type          = Town
| nickname                 = 
| motto                    = "Proud of our past, in touch with the future"

| image_skyline            = 
| imagesize                = 
| image_caption            = 
| image_flag               = 
| image_seal               = 
| image_map                = File:Clark County Indiana Incorporated and Unincorporated areas Sellersburg Highlighted 1868670.svg
| mapsize                  = 250x200px
| map_caption              = Location of Sellersburg in Clark County, Indiana.
| image_map1               = 
| mapsize1                 = 
| map_caption1             = 
| subdivision_type         = Country
| subdivision_name         = United States
| subdivision_type1        = State
| subdivision_name1        = Indiana
| subdivision_type2        = County
| subdivision_name2        = Clark
| subdivision_type3        = Township
| subdivision_name3        = Silver Creek
| government_footnotes     = 
| government_type          = Town Council
| leader_title            = Councilmen
| leader_name             = Scott Mcvoy, Randall Mobley, Brad Amos, Terry Langford, Matthew Czarnecki 
| leader_title1             = Town Manager
| leader_name1              = Charlie Smith <ref>

Sellersburg is a town located within Silver Creek Township, Clark County, Indiana, United States. It had a population of 9,310 at time of the 2020 census. Sellersburg is located along Interstate 65, about 15 minutes north of Louisville.

History
Sellersburg takes its name from its founder, Moses Sellers, who laid out the town in 1846. Sellersburg  incorporated in 1890. The first post office at Sellersburg was established in 1854, at which time the name was spelled Sellersburgh.

Silver Creek High School's boys' basketball team won the 2019 and 2021 IHSAA 3-A state championships.

Geography
Sellersburg is located at  (38.386823, -85.757543).

Demographics

2010 census
As of the census of 2010, there were 6,128 people, 2,443 households, and 1,697 families living in the town. The racial makeup of the town was 94.2% White, 0.8% African American, 0.3% Native American, 0.3% Asian, 2.9% from other races, and 1.6% from two or more races. Hispanic or Latino of any race were 5.5% of the population.

There were 2,443 households, of which 33.7% had children under the age of 18 living with them, 50.6% were married couples living together, 13.2% had a female householder with no husband present, 5.6% had a male householder with no wife present, and 30.5% were non-families. 26.2% of all households were made up of individuals, and 10.4% had someone living alone who was 65 years of age or older. The average household size was 2.48 and the average family size was 2.96.

The median age in the town was 38 years. 24.6% of residents were under the age of 18; 8.3% were between the ages of 18 and 24; 26.1% were from 25 to 44; 26.4% were from 45 to 64; and 14.7% were 65 years of age or older. The gender makeup of the town was 48.6% male and 51.4% female.

2000 census
As of the census of 2000, there were 6,072 people, 2,407 households, and 1,757 families living in the town. The racial makeup of the town was 98.48% White, 1.04% Hispanic or Latino of any race, 0.28% Native American, 0.25% African American, 0.16% Asian, 0.02% Pacific Islander, 0.28% from other races, and 0.53% from two or more races.

There were 2,407 households, out of which 33.0% had children under the age of 18 living with them, 57.0% were married couples living together, 11.8% had a female householder with no husband present, and 27.0% were non-families. 23.3% of all households were made up of individuals, and 7.2% had someone living alone who was 65 years of age or older. The average household size was 2.50 and the average family size was 2.92.

In the town, the population was spread out, with 24.5% under the age of 18, 8.4% from 18 to 24, 30.8% from 25 to 44, 23.4% from 45 to 64, and 12.8% who were 65 years of age or older. The median age was 37 years. For every 100 females, there were 92.6 males. For every 100 females age 18 and over, there were 89.3 males.

The median income for a household in the town was $39,832, and the median income for a family was $46,512. Males had a median income of $30,977 versus $21,974 for females. The per capita income for the town was $18,648. About 4.1% of families and 5.3% of the population were below the poverty line, including 8.2% of those under age 18 and 2.6% of those age 65 or over.

Education
Silver Creek School Corporation operates a primary, elementary, middle, and high school in Sellersburg.  

Silver Creek School Corporation was created after the West Clark Community School board voted unanimously to permit the divorce of Silver Creek schools from the district on November 9, 2017.  

Sellersburg has a public library, a branch of the Charlestown-Clark County Public Library. A campus of Ivy Tech Community College is also located in Sellersburg.

Politics
In December of 2021, local residents of Sellersburg formed a grassroots political movement called "Keep Sellersburg Small" in response to rapid growth, commercialization, and development of multi-family housing in the area. Many residents have complained about excessive traffic due to these issues and have called on the Town Council of Sellersburg  to limit the growth.

Infrastructure

Transportation
In the early 1980s the Clark Regional Airport was constructed, a regional airport supporting small and mid-size aircraft.

Notable people

 Will Kimmel - NASCAR and ARCA driver

References

External links

 Town of Sellersburg, Indiana website

Towns in Clark County, Indiana
Towns in Indiana
Louisville metropolitan area
Populated places established in 1846
1846 establishments in Indiana